Michael R. Frey is a politician from Virginia, who was a Republican member of the Fairfax County Board of Supervisors from 1991 to 2015; representing the Sully district in the western part of the county. The Sully district includes the unincorporated town of Chantilly and part of Dulles Airport.

Prior to his 1991 election as supervisor from the newly created district, Frey worked as an aide to first Chairman of the Board of Supervisors John F. Herrity and later Springfield district Supervisor Elaine N. McConnell.

In January 2015, Frey announced he would retire and not seek another term as Sully District supervisor.

References

External links
Fairfax County bio

Living people
Virginia Republicans
People from Chantilly, Virginia
George Mason University alumni
Members of the Fairfax County Board of Supervisors
20th-century American politicians
21st-century American politicians
Year of birth missing (living people)